The Rural Municipality of Redberry No. 435 is a rural municipality (RM) in the Canadian province of Saskatchewan within Census Division No. 16 and  Division No. 5.

History 
The RM of Redberry No. 435 incorporated as a rural municipality on January 1, 1913.

Geography

Communities and localities 
The following urban municipalities are surrounded by the RM.

Towns
 Hafford

Villages
 Krydor

The following unincorporated communities are within the RM.

Localities
 Drolow
 Redberry
 Redberry Park

Demographics 

Attractions 
 Blaine Lake
Blaine Lake Provincial Campground
 Rabbit Lake
 Redberry Lake
Redberry Lake Regional Park
Redberry Lake National Migratory Bird Sanctuary

Government 
The RM of Redberry No. 435 is governed by an elected municipal council and an appointed administrator that meets on the second Tuesday of every month. The reeve of the RM is Les Welkie while its administrator is Darrin Beaudoin. The RM's office is located in Hafford.

Transportation 
 Saskatchewan Highway 40
 Saskatchewan Highway 340
 Saskatchewan Highway 685
 Saskatchewan Highway 781
 Canadian Pacific Railway {abandoned)
 Hafford Airport

See also 
List of rural municipalities in Saskatchewan

References 

Redberry
Division No. 16, Saskatchewan